Chuchaujasa (Quechua chuchaw agave, q'asa mountain pass, "agave pass") is a mountain in the northwest of the Vilcabamba mountain range in the Andes of Peru, about  high. It is situated in the Cusco Region, La Convención Province, Vilcabamba District. Chuchaujasa lies west of Quenuaorco and northeast of Azulcocha and Panta at a brook or valley named Hatun Wayq'u ("big brook (or valley)").

References

Mountains of Peru
Mountains of Cusco Region